Divided City is a novel written by Theresa Breslin and published on 5 May 2005 by Doubleday. The novel is written for teenagers and adults concerning the problems of sectarianism in Glasgow and racism against asylum seekers.

The main characters are young boys called Graham, a Protestant supporting Rangers. Joe, a Catholic supporting Celtic, and a young asylum seeker named Kyoul.

Plot Outline

A dark stain, spreading. A young man lies bleeding in the street. It's Glasgow. And it's May - the marching season. The Orange Walks have begun. Graham doesn't want to be involved. He just wants to play football with his new mate, Joe. But then he witnesses a shocking moment of violence. A gripping tale about two boys who must find their own answers - and their own way forward - in a world divided by differences.

See also
Sectarianism in Glasgow
Orange walk
Old Firm

References

2005 British novels
Scottish novels
Novels set in Glasgow
2005 in Scotland
Sectarianism
Doubleday (publisher) books